Kevin Cohee (/ˈkoʊhiːˈ/ born October 20, 1957) is an African American multi-millionaire business executive. He is Chairman and CEO of One United Bank, the largest Black owned bank and the first Black owned internet bank in America. He has held this position since 1996.

Early life 
Cohee was born in Kansas City, Missouri, to African-American parents. He never met his father, and his mother passed away due to an allergic reaction to penicillin when he was six years old. Cohee was raised by his uncle, Richard Carr, a pediatric dentist in Boston.

Education 
Cohee graduated from Harvard Law School with a Juris Doctor degree. He also holds a Master of Business Administration and a Bachelor of Arts degree from the University of Wisconsin; where he was a 4-year letterman in football.

Career

Salomon Brothers 
Cohee obtained his M.B.A. from the University of Wisconsin and his J.D. degree from Harvard in 1985. He became an investment banker at Salomon Smith Barney shortly after.

Military Professional Services 
In 1989, Cohee and his colleague Terri Williams acquired Military Professional Services, Inc. (MPS), a 29-year-old company that marketed Visa and MasterCard credit cards to military personnel. Cohee built MPS into a profitable company, establishing a $40,000,000 portfolio with over 20,000 customers.

He sold Military Professional Services to First Chicago Corp in 1991.

OneUnited Bank 
In 1995, Cohee acquired majority controlling interest in Boston Bank of Commerce, one of the four unifying banks that established OneUnited Bank. He was elected Chairman and CEO the following year. The bank has offices in Miami and Los Angeles.

Business Ventures

BankBlack X 
On October 7, 2019, Cohee and COO, Terri Williams, announced BankBlack X: A nationwide plan to close the racial wealth gap.  Its goal is to "Galvanize the community to share the truth about Black people and money, and make financial literacy a core value of the Black community."

References 

Wisconsin Badgers football players
Harvard Law School alumni
1957 births
Living people
Businesspeople from Kansas City, Missouri
American chief executives of financial services companies
University of Wisconsin–Madison alumni
21st-century American businesspeople